Deborah Cleland Grey,  (born July 1, 1952) is a retired Canadian member of Parliament from Alberta for the Reform Party of Canada, the Canadian Alliance, and the Conservative Party of Canada. She was the first female federal leader of the Opposition in Canadian history.  She currently serves on the advisory board of the Leaders' Debates Commission.

Before politics
Born in Vancouver, British Columbia,  Grey pursued studies in sociology, English and education at Burrard Inlet Bible Institute, Trinity Western College and the University of Alberta. She then worked as a teacher in a number of rural Alberta communities until 1989.

Political career
Grey's first run for office was in the 1988 election, when she ran as the Reform candidate in Beaver River, a mostly rural riding in northeastern Alberta. She finished a distant fourth behind Progressive Conservative John Dahmer. However, Dahmer died before he could be sworn in. Grey won a by-election in March 1989, almost tripling her vote total from the 1988 election to become Reform's first MP. It was only the second time the Progressive Conservatives had lost a seat in Alberta since 1968.  Party leader Preston Manning immediately named her as Reform's deputy leader.  The two were friends for many years; Grey calls him "Misterbrainiola".  Her first legislative assistant was a young Stephen Harper.

Reform elected 52 MPs in the 1993 election, replacing the Progressive Conservatives as the main right-wing party in Canada. Grey won her first full term in this election.  In addition to her duties as deputy leader, she also became chairwoman of the enlarged Reform caucus. In 1997, Beaver River was abolished and its territory split into two neighbouring ridings. Grey moved to Edmonton North at the request of several local conservatives dissatisfied with being represented by a Liberal, John Loney (elected in the 1993 landslide).  Lomey retired ahead of that year's election, and Grey won handily. She continued to represent this riding for the remainder of her career.  Reform became the Official Opposition in that election.

Grey served as Reform's deputy leader and caucus chairwoman until March 2000, when the Reform Party was folded into the Canadian Alliance. When Manning stepped down as Leader of the Opposition to contest the Alliance leadership race, Grey was appointed interim leader of the Alliance, and hence Leader of the Opposition. She was the first female Leader of the Opposition in Canadian history. She held the post until new Alliance leader Stockwell Day was elected to the House of Commons in September 2000. He appointed Grey as deputy leader and caucus chairwoman once again.

Grey resigned those posts on April 24, 2001, in protest against Day's leadership. In July of that year, Grey quit the Canadian Alliance and joined 10 other Alliance dissidents in the "Independent Alliance Caucus".  While Chuck Strahl eventually emerged as the dissidents' leader, Grey lent the group instant credibility since she had been Reform/Alliance's matriarch as well as the deputy leader.  When Day offered an amnesty to the dissidents, Grey was one of seven who turned it down and formed the Democratic Representative Caucus (DRC), led by Strahl with Grey as deputy leader.  In September 2001, the DRC formed a coalition caucus with the Progressive Conservatives, and Grey served as chairwoman of the PC-DRC caucus.  She later said that she lost confidence in Day after seeing him attack his staffers after a public gaffe.

In April 2002, after Harper defeated Day in the race to be the Alliance leader, Grey and all but two of the DRC MPs rejoined the Alliance caucus, and in December 2003, the Alliance and the Progressive Conservatives ratified an agreement to merge into the Conservative Party of Canada. Grey was co-chair, with former PC leader Peter MacKay, of the new party's first leadership convention in March 2004.

Grey was not shy about tossing verbal barbs at the governing Liberals. She called Jean Chrétien "the Shawinigan Strangler", Don Boudria "Binder Boy", Jane Stewart "Miss Management" and Paul Martin "Captain Whirlybird".

Deborah Grey is also well known for refusing to join the lucrative MP Pension Plan and ridiculing other "MP porkers" for feeding at the public trough. Later she bought her way back into the pension plan resulting in former Prime Minister Joe Clark labeling her the "high priestess of hypocrisy".

Grey's riding of Edmonton North was abolished for the 2004 federal election, and Grey retired from politics rather than attempting nomination in another. She was Western chairwoman of the Conservative campaign in the 2006 election, in which Harper became Prime Minister of Canada.

Retirement
Shortly after retiring, she published her autobiography, Never Retreat, Never Explain, Never Apologize: My Life and My Politics. In 2007, she was made an Officer of the Order of Canada. On April 22, 2013, she was appointed to the Security Intelligence Review Committee, and along with that appointment, was made a Privy Councillor, giving her the title, "The Honourable".  It was announced that Grey was stepping down from the Security Intelligence Review Committee on May 1, 2015, in a press release from the Prime Minister's Office.

Personal life
Grey has been married to Lewis Larson since August 7, 1993; they have no children together. They are grandparents through Lewis' children by his first marriage.

Election results

|-

|Liberal
|Jim Jacuta
|align="right"|14,786
|align="right"|34.32%
|align="right"|
|align="right"|$28,846

|New Democratic Party
|Laurie Lang
|align="right"|3,216
|align="right"|7.46%
|align="right"|
|align="right"|$815

|Progressive Conservative
|Dean Sanduga
|align="right"|3,010
|align="right"|6.98%
|align="right"|
|align="right"|$9,842
|- bgcolor="white"
!align="right" colspan=3|Total valid votes
!align="right"|43,075
!align="right"|100.00%
!align="right"|
|- bgcolor="white"
!align="right" colspan=3|Total rejected ballots
!align="right"|174
!align="right"|0.40%
!align="right"|
|- bgcolor="white"
!align="right" colspan=3|Turnout
!align="right"|43,249
!align="right"|57.20%
!align="right"|

|-

|Liberal
|Jonathan Murphy
|align="right"|11,820
|align="right"|32.47%
|
|align="right"|$46,517
 
|New Democratic Party
|Ray Martin
|align="right"|5,413
|align="right"|14.87%
|
|align="right"|$60,286

|Progressive Conservative
|Mitch Panciuk
|align="right"|2,811
|align="right"|7.72%
|
|align="right"|$51,169

|Natural Law
|Ric Johnsen
|align="right"|226
|align="right"|0.62%
|align="right"|
|align="right"|
|- bgcolor="white"
!align="right" colspan=3|Total valid votes
!align="right"|36,394
!align="right"|100.00%
!
|- bgcolor="white"
!align="right" colspan=3|Total rejected ballots
!align="right"|99
!align="right"|0.27%
!
|- bgcolor="white"
!align="right" colspan=3|Turnout
!align="right"|36,493
!align="right"|55.63%
!

References

External links
 Official site
 

1952 births
Living people
Canadian Alliance MPs
Canadian autobiographers
Canadian women non-fiction writers
Women members of the House of Commons of Canada
Female Canadian political party leaders
Leaders of the Opposition (Canada)
Members of the House of Commons of Canada from Alberta
Officers of the Order of Canada
Politicians from Vancouver
Reform Party of Canada candidates in the 1988 Canadian federal election
Reform Party of Canada MPs
Trinity Western University alumni
University of Alberta alumni
Women autobiographers
Women in Alberta politics
Writers from Vancouver
20th-century Canadian women politicians
21st-century Canadian politicians
21st-century Canadian women politicians
Women opposition leaders